

La Laguna Lake is a lake in the Sud Cinti Province, Chuquisaca Department, Bolivia.

References 

Lakes of Bolivia
Landforms of Chuquisaca Department